The Battle of the Orontes was fought on 15 September 994 between the Byzantines and their Hamdanid allies under Michael Bourtzes against the forces of the Fatimid vizier of Damascus, the Turkish general Manjutakin. The battle was a Fatimid victory.

Background

In the 990s, the Byzantine Empire and the Fatimids were involved in a war in Syria, which also involved the Byzantine vassal state of Aleppo, controlled by the Hamdanid dynasty. In 993/994, the Fatimid governor of Damascus, the Turkish general Manjutakin, besieged Apamea, and Bourtzes, the Byzantine doux of Antioch, came forth to relieve the city.

Battle

The two armies met across two fords on the Orontes River near Apamea on 15 September 994. Manjutakin sent his forces to attack the Byzantines' Hamdanid allies across one ford while pinning the main Byzantine force down on the other with his Turks and mercenary units. His men succeeded in breaking through the Hamdanids, turned round and attacked the Byzantine force in the rear. The Byzantine army panicked and fled, losing some 5,000 men in the process.

Aftermath

Shortly after the battle, the Fatimid caliphate took control of Syria, removing the Hamdanids from power they had held since 890. Manjutakin went on to capture Azaz and continued his siege of Aleppo.

This defeat led to the direct intervention of Byzantine emperor Basil II in a lightning campaign the next year, and Bourtzes' dismissal from his post and his replacement by Damian Dalassenos. Basil's sudden arrival and the exaggeration of his army's strength circulating in the Fatimid camp caused panic in the Fatimid army, especially because Manjutakin, expecting no threat, had ordered his cavalry horses to be dispersed around the city for pasture. Despite having a considerably larger and well-rested army, Manjutakin was at a disadvantage. He burned his camp and retreated to Damascus without battle. The Byzantines besieged Tripoli unsuccessfully and occupied Tartus, which they refortified and garrisoned with Armenian troops.

References

Sources 
 .
 
 
 

the Orontes
990s in the Byzantine Empire
994
Orontes
Orontes
Syria under the Fatimid Caliphate